The 1994 Navy Midshipmen football team represented the United States Naval Academy (USNA) as an independent during the 1994 NCAA Division I-A football season. The team was led by fifth-year head coach George Chaump.

Schedule

Personnel

References

Navy
Navy Midshipmen football seasons
Navy Midshipmen football